John Bennet (c. 1575 – after 1614) was a composer of the English madrigal school. Little is known for certain of Bennet's life, but his first collection of madrigals was published in 1599.

Life
Bennet's madrigals include "All Creatures Now" as well as "Weep, O Mine Eyes". The latter is an homage to John Dowland, using part of Dowland's most famous piece, "Flow My Tears", also known in its pavane form as Lachrymae Antiquae. John Bennet's life is mostly undocumented. Bennet did however leave behind evidence that his impact is great. Bennet dedicated his madrigal volume, These First Fruits of My Simple Skill The Endeavors of a Young Wit to Ralph Assheton in 1599. Assheton held civic office in both Lancashire and Cheshire, he was dedicated as a token for favours received. It seems probable, therefore, that Bennet came from the north-west of England, and was born about 1575–80.

Early life 
Bennet was born into a prosperous family and received his first exposure to music as a choirboy and advanced in music by his early twenties, he produced the Volume of 17: Madrigals for Four Voices. At around that same time, Bennet fashioned four psalm settings and a prayer for the 1599 Barley's psalter. Though Bennet's style showed the influence of Wilbye, Weelkes, and Dowland, his greatest debt was to Thomas Morley.

Social Status 
It is likely that Bennet had strong connections in high places in English society: many of his madrigals were written for festive occasions held at Court or in private residences of wealthy patrons in London. His madrigal, "Eliza, her Name Gives Honour" was one of several madrigals written for the feted guest at a celebration, in this case Queen Elizabeth. At such events, choirboys from the Chapel Royal were typically the featured performers.

Composition Style 
John Bennet composed chiefly in the English madrigal style. He also composed several religious songs for church choral performances. His music shows a great deal of influence from the works of Thomas Morley. Bennet did not borrow musical ideas from earlier settings but he was knowledgeable about the latest trends of English madrigal during the time he was alive.

Works
Madrigals

Madrigalls to Fovre Voyces (Madrigals for Four Voices) (London, 1599) [17 madrigals]
 I wander up and down
 Weep silly soul disdained [AKA: Mourn silly soul disdained]
 So gracious is thy sweet self [AKA: So lovely is thy dear self]
 Let go, why do you stay me [AKA: My dear, why do you stay]
 Come, shepherds, follow me
 I languish to complain me
 Sing out, ye nymphs [AKA: Sing loud, ye nymphs; Shout loud, ye nymphs]
 Thirsis, sleepest thou
 Ye restless thoughts
 When as I glance [AKA: When as I looked]
 Cruel unkind my heart thou hast bereft me
 O sleep, O sleep fond fancy
 Weep, O mine eyes [AKA: Flow, O my tears]
 Since neither tunes of joy
 O grief, where shall poor grief
 O sweet grief, O sweet sighs
 Rest, now Amphion

Six madrigals (all for four voices) by Bennet were published in Thomas Ravenscroft's A Briefe Discourse (London, 1614)
 A hunts vp (The hunt is up)
 For the hearne and ducke [AKA: Lure, falconers, lure! (Low'r, falc'ners, low'r), a hunting madrigal; Hunting for the hearn and duck; The Falconers' Song]
 The Elues Daunce (The Elves' Dance)
 Three Fooles
 The Seruant of his Mistris (The Servant of his Mistress) [AKA: My Mistress is as fair as fine; The lover to his mistress]
 Their Wedlocke (A Borgens a borgen, che hard long agoe)

All creatures now are merry minded, for 5 voices [pub. in The Triumphs of Oriana, 1601]
Round about in a fair ring, for 4 voices [pub. 1614]
My mistress is as fair as fine, for 4 voices [AKA: The Lover to His Mistress] (different setting than in Ravenscroft's A Briefe Discourse)

Consort Songs
Eliza, her name gives honour
Venus' birds

Anthems
O be joyful in the Lord all ye lands (Psalm 100), soloist, chorus and organ
 O God of gods, in 5 parts
 O God O king of kings, in 4 parts
 Thou art, O Lord, my strength and stay (Psalm 28) [in Richard Langdon's Divine Harmony, 1774]

Psalms [all pub. in The Whole Booke of Psalmes, ed. Thomas Ravenscroft, 1621]
 My soul praise thou the Lord allways (Psalm 146)
 Oft they, now Israel may say (Psalm 129)
 O Lord how joyful is the king (Psalm 21)
 O Lord I put my trust in thee (Psalm 31)
 Thou heard that Israel dost keepe (Psalm 80)

References

Citations

Attribution

External links

 John Bennett at the Dictionary of National Biography, 1885-1900

 Free scores by John Bennet in the Choral Public Domain Library (ChoralWiki)
 Free scores by John Bennet at Tomás Luis de Victoria

Listen to free recordings of John Bennett's songs by the Umeå Academic Choir.

1570s births
17th-century deaths
16th-century English composers
English male composers
17th-century English composers
17th-century male musicians